The Wairarapa, a geographical region of New Zealand, lies in the south-eastern corner of the North Island, east of metropolitan Wellington and south-west of the Hawke's Bay Region.  It is lightly populated, having several rural service towns, with Masterton being the largest.  It is named after its largest lake, Lake Wairarapa.

The region is referred to as The Wairarapa, particularly when used after a preposition (e.g., locals will say they live "in the Wairarapa", and travel "to" and "from the Wairarapa").

Boundaries

The Ngāti Kahungunu tribe's boundary for the region is similar. Their tribal area begins at Pōrangahau and ends at Turakirae. It is the southernmost of their three rohe (homelands) running down the eastern North Island from Wairoa. For the Rangitāne tribe, the Wairarapa is part of a wider homeland that includes Manawatu and Horowhenua.

The north–south divide was reinforced in 1989, when local authority boundaries changed. The new Tararua District Council covers northern Wairarapa and southern Hawke's Bay. The central and southern Wairarapa was divided into three district councils: Masterton, Carterton and the South Wairarapa.  South Wairarapa District Council, based in Martinborough, is the local government authority for areas south of Carterton, encompassing the towns of Greytown, Featherston and Martinborough and the rural areas down to the Hutt. It is separated from Upper Hutt and Lower Hutt cities by the Rimutaka Ranges. Carterton District Council based in Carterton is the fastest growing area in New Zealand and the Masterton District Council covers areas up to the Tararua District.

In terms of national politics, after the proportional representation electoral system was introduced in 1996, the Wairarapa electorate expanded to include southern Hawke's Bay.

The area from Mount Bruce north, extending through Eketahuna, Pahiatua, Woodville, Dannevirke, to just north of Norsewood is part of the Tararua District and is in the Manawatū-Whanganui region, because it is in the catchment of the headwaters of the Manawatu River. The river runs westward between the two mountain ranges (Tararua Range to the south and Ruahine Range to the north) via the Manawatu Gorge, to pass through Palmerston North and reach the west coast of the North Island.

The east coast contains settlements such as Tinui, Castlepoint, and Riversdale Beach, while the main southern rivers drain through or past Lake Wairarapa to discharge into Palliser Bay east of Cook Strait.

History

The name Wairarapa means "glistening waters" in te reo Māori. According to some oral histories, the Polynesian explorer Kupe named the wetlands after touching down in the area several times. According to other oral histories, explorer Haunui named the wetlands after the way the lake appeared to glisten from the Remutaka Ranges to the west.

During British colonial times the region was also known colloquially as The Wydrop.

Rangitane and Ngāti Kahungunu were the resident Māori tribes (iwi) when European explorers arrived in the area in the 1770s.

European settlement began in the early 1840s, initially on large grazing runs leased from Māori, and with closer settlement from the 1850s.

On 23 January 1855 the strongest earthquake recorded in New Zealand hit the region; it reached magnitude 8.2 on the Richter Scale and caused five deaths among the then sparse population.

In World War II United States Marine Corps soldiers were stationed in the Wairarapa with two battalions in Masterton.

Economy
The agricultural industries, including forestry, cropping, sheep, beef and dairy farming, are major land users.  The area around Martinborough, in the south, is notable for its vineyards and wine, as are the outskirts of Masterton and Carterton. Beer has been brewed at Mangatainoka, near Pahiatua, since 1889. Deer farming is growing in importance.

Transport
The region is well served by different transport modes. The State Highway 2, via Rimutaka Hill Road connects the region to Wellington in the south and the Manawatu in the north. The Wairarapa railway line connects the region via the Rimutaka Tunnel to Wellington, and connects with the Palmerston North - Gisborne Line at Woodville. A commuter rail passenger service, the Wairarapa Connection from Masterton to Wellington is operated by Transdev Wellington for Metlink. Before 2016, it was operated by Tranz Metro.

Many residents, especially in the southern towns such as Featherston and Greytown, commute to work in Wellington, either by train or over the Rimutaka Ranges by car.

Wildlife

Many of New Zealand's endangered native bird species can be seen at the Pukaha / Mount Bruce National Wildlife Centre, which is just south of Eketahuna.

Notable people
 Bob Charles, champion golfer and winner of the 1963 British Open, at Carterton.
 Masterton-born singer/songwriter Ladyhawke aka Pip Brown
 Jemaine Clement, one half of the comedy band/TV series "Flight of the Conchords"
James Cameron, motion film director
 Murray Halberg, middle-distance runner and Olympic gold medalist, at Eketahuna
 Brian Lochore, All Black captain and World Cup-winning coach, at Masterton
 Marcus Daniell Masterton-born professional tennis player.
 Keith Holyoake, former Prime Minister of New Zealand, at Pahiatua.
 Maurice Wilkins, Nobel Prize-winning scientist, whose work led to the discovery of the structure of DNA, at Pongaroa.
 Alan Graham MacDiarmid, Nobel Prize-winning chemist, born in Masterton.
 Vincent Ward, Film director, at Greytown (What dreams may come, The Navigator, Vigil, River Queen)
 Raybon Kan, Comedian, at Masterton
 Mike Fabulous, member of The Black Seeds and Fly My Pretties
 Cathy Penney, helicopter pilot and founder (with Laurie Bargh) of Heli-Flight Wairarapa
 Jesse Ryder, International cricketer, at Masterton
 Ross Taylor, International cricketer
 Featherston-born Professor Max Abbott, recipient of the New Zealand 1990 Commemoration Medal, Pro-Vice Chancellor of Auckland University of Technology, and former Chairman of Auckland's Waitamata DHB and president of the World Federation for Mental Health.
 Arthur Prior, Masterton-born logician and philosopher. Professor of Philosophy at the University of Manchester, fellow and tutor at Balliol College, Oxford, and founder of Temporal logic.

See also
List of regions in New Zealand
Georgina Beyer, Ex MP for Wairarapa, ex Mayor of Carterton.
Grant Batty, Greytown, Ex *All Black*
Geoffrey Fisken, Grazier, Fighter Pilot
Zac Guildford, Masterton, All Black
New Zealand wine

References

External links

Wairarapa Times-Age newspaper